Scott Frederic Wildman (born April 12, 1951 in San Diego, California) is an American teacher, labor organizer and politician. He is a member of the Democratic Party.

Career
In 1996, he ran for the Glendale-Burbank based 43rd district in the California State Assembly left open when incumbent Republican James Rogan decided to run for congress.  Wildman was an underdog, but demographic changes plus coordination with other Democratic campaigns in the area allowed him to eke out a 192-vote win over wealthy GOP businessman John Geranios. The race was so close that Wildman was not officially declared the winner until November 23, 1996.

In 1998, Wildman sought reelection and was a top Republican target. An aggressive district outreach operation garnered Wildman strong support from  Armenian and Latino voters, as well as endorsements from local Republican and Democratic officials, labor, teachers and law enforcement for his re-election effort. He also lucked out when his GOP opponent turned out to have too many skeletons in his closet.  As a result, Republicans did not mount much of a challenge, and Wildman scored an easy win.

In 2000, he did not seek reelection and instead opted to run for an open state senate seat. He faced off against fellow assemblyman Jack Scott from neighboring Pasadena in the Democratic primary. Wildman was not supposed to be much of a match for the Scott, a former president of Pasadena City College, whose assembly district boasted significantly more voters. He nevertheless made the race close, scoring 46.7% of the vote  to Scott's 53.3%.

In 2001, several weeks after his tenure in the assembly had come to an end, Wildman lost another close race, this time for a seat on the Los Angeles City council. He came in third behind future mayor of Los Angeles Eric Garcetti and former councilman Mike Woo.

Electoral history

References

Democratic Party members of the California State Assembly
Living people
1951 births